The following is a list of programs shown on the ABS-CBN News Channel. The channel primarily broadcasts programming relating to news, business, politics, and public affairs, along with other magazine religious and documentary-style programs. The network also airs programming sourced from ABS-CBN, ABS-CBN Regional, DZMM TeleRadyo, Jeepney TV and The Filipino Channel.

Current broadcast

News 
 ANC Headlines (1999–present)
 ANC Breaking News
 ANC Live (2001–present)
 ANC Presents
 Dateline Philippines (1996–present)
 Dateline Philippines Weekend with Rica Lazo
  ANC Rundown (2019–present)
 ANC Rundown @ 7am - (Mike Navallo & Nikki De Guzman)
 ANC Rundown @ 10am - (Stanley Palisada)
 ANC Rundown @ 2pm - (Denice Dinsay)
 ANC Rundown @ 4pm - (Ron Cruz)    
 ANC Rundown Saturday @ 7am - (Vivienne Gulla)
 ANC Rundown Saturday @ 10am - (Rica Lazo)
 Top Story (2002–present)  
 Top Story Saturday 
 The World Tonight (simulcast on Kapamilya Channel) (1999–present)
  The World Tonight Saturday
 TV Patrol (simulcast on A2Z, Kapamilya Channel and TeleRadyo) (2006–2015, 2020–present)
 TV Patrol Weekend Business 
 Market Edge  (2015–present)
 Market Edge @ 9am  (2015–present)
 Market Edge @ 3pm  (2015–present)
 Insights with April Lee Tan  (2020–present)

 Talk 
 Headstart (2010–present)
 Hot Copy (2010–present)

 Documentary/specials 
 ANC Documentary Hour (2015–present)

 Infotainment 
 Rev  (2017–present) 
 Lifestyle 
 Cityscape/Cityscape Passport (2009–present)
 Executive Class (2005–present)
 Graceful Living (2016–present)
 Modern Living TV (2014–present)
 Philippine Realty TV (2008–present)
 CHInoyTV (2017–present)
 State of the Art (2018–present)
 LSS: The Martin Nievera Show (2018–present)
 Show Me the Market (2018–present)
 The Art Show (2018–present)
 The Wine Show (2018–present)
 Booze Traveler (2018–present) (also broadcast on Travel TV)
 Chasing Flavors with Claude Tayag (2018–present)
 At The Table (2018–present)

 Travel 
 #BecomingFilipino: Your Travel Blog (2016–present)
 Asian Air Safari (2006–present)
 Galing Pook (2013–present)

 Religious 
 Feast TV (also aired on IBC) (Produced by Shepherd's Voice Radio and Television Foundation, Inc.) 
 The Word Exposed with Luis Antonio Cardinal Tagle (also aired on S+A and TV Maria) (Produced by Jesuit Communications)
 Misa sa Veritas (also aired on 5, One PH and DZRH News Television) (also broadcast on Veritas 846)

 Television programs from TFC 
 Adobo Nation (2008–present)
 Balitang America (2002–present)
 TFC News: Europe & Middle East (2018–present)
 Citizen Pinoy (2004–present) Juan EU Konek (2014–present)

 Television programs from Metro Channel 
 Casa Daza (also broadcast/aired on Metro Channel)
 Dreamcatchers (also broadcast/aired on Metro Channel)

 Previously shown 
 ABS-CBN Headlines (2000–2003)
 ABS-CBN Insider (2003–2006)
 After the Fact (2021–2022)
 Ako Ang Simula (2011–2013)
 Bandila (2006–2014)
  Business Nightly (2000–2020)
 The Bottomline with Boy Abunda (2009–2020)
 Breakfast (1999–2001)
 Cash Flow sourced from CNBC Asia
 CNTV News (from CNTV) (2021)
 The Correspondents (1998–2010)
 Dayaw (2015–2021)
 DZMM TeleRadyo on ANC (during the COVID-19 pandemic) 
 Early Edition (2017–2020)
 Failon Ngayon (2009–2020)
 First Look (2006–2015)
 Gametime (2017–2020)
 Global News Green Living (2011–2020) 
 I Survived: Hindi Sumusuko Ang Pinoy (2009–2010)
 Knowledge Power Krusada (2010–2013)
 Local Legends (2019–2020)
 Lehrer News Hour sourced from VOA 
 Magandang Gabi... Bayan Magandang Umaga, Pilipinas (2005–2007)
 Matters of Fact on Early Edition (2017–2021)
 Mission Possible (2015–2020)
 Mornings @ ANC (2006–2017)
 Managing Asia (2007–2016)
 My Puhunan (2013–2020)
 Newshour sourced from Al Jazeera English
 News Central (1998–2010)
 On The Money (2012–2020)
 Patrol ng Pilipino (2010–2013)
 Primetime on ANC (2011–2015)
 Probe Profiles (2009–2010)
 Pulso: Aksyon Balita (1999–2000)
 The Rundown (2010–2011)
 Trending with Kelly (2017–2021) 
 Rated K (2004–2018)
 S.O.C.O. (Scene of the Crime Operatives) (2005–2014)
 Sports U (2015–2018)
 Street Signs (2014–2016)
 Sports Unlimited (1997–2015)
 Storyline (2008–2015)
 Square Off (2006–2020)
 Swak na Swak (2020–2021)
 Travel Time (1999–2015)
 Tina Monzon Palma Reports (2021–2022)
 Umagang Kay Ganda (2007–2015)
 VOA This Week sourced from VOA
 The Weekend News Talkback (2000–2020)
 XXX: Exklusibong, Explosibong, Exposé'' (2006–2013)

See also
ABS-CBN News Channel
A2Z
List of programs broadcast by ABS-CBN

References

 
ABS-CBN News Channel